Van Gieson's stain is a mixture of picric acid and acid fuchsin. It is the simplest method of differential staining of collagen and other connective tissue. It was introduced to histology by American neuropsychiatrist and pathologist Ira Van Gieson.

HvG stain generally refers to the combination of hematoxylin and Van Gieson's stain, but can possibly refer to a combination of hibiscus extract-iron solution and Van Gieson's stain.

Other dyes
Other dyes used in connection with Van Gieson staining include:
 Alcian blue
 Amido black 10B
 Verhoeff's stain

References

Histology
Staining